The British Pro Championships also known as the British Professional Championships  and British Professional Lawn Tennis Championships  is a defunct men's professional tennis tournament that was played on grass courts from 1920 to 1967. The tournament featured both singles and doubles competitions.

History
The tournament was first staged in Roehampton on 2 August 1920, it was not hosted again for a further seven years until 1928 when it was staged in London England on 5 November 1928. The championships were played outdoors on grass courts and alternated between various locations from 1929 until the event ended on 13 August 1967.

Venues
The tournament was staged in different locations for the duration of its run they included:

Men's singles
Previous champions included:

References

Sources
 McCauley, Joe; Trabert, Tony; Collins, Bud (2000). The History of Professional Tennis. The Short Run Book Company Limited. Exeter. England.

External links
 https://app.thetennisbase.com/British Pro Championships Roll of Honour

Defunct tennis tournaments in the United Kingdom
Grass court tennis tournaments
Tennis tournaments in England
Professional tennis tournaments before the Open Era